"Adore" is a song by Prince. It is the last track on his 1987 double album Sign o' the Times, following the live track "It's Gonna Be a Beautiful Night" (the crowd noise from which bleeds into the beginning of the song). A long, ornate slow jam featuring Atlanta Bliss and Eric Leeds on horns, it was described by NME reviewer Paolo Hewitt as "a sugar ballad that harks back to the Stylistics but is indelibly Prince's, a lush yet remarkable piece of music, and a fitting climax". It received significant radio play despite never being released as a single, and became an occasional part of Prince's concert repertoire. A 4:39-long edit of the song appears on the 1993 compilation album The Hits/The B-Sides, and the Girl 6 soundtrack album contains the full-length version. Prince's 2002 box set One Nite Alone... Live! includes a solo performance of "Adore" with piano accompaniment.

In 2009, Essence magazine included the song in their list of the "25 Best Slow Jams of All Time".

In 2010, users of AOL Radio voted "Adore" #2 on a ranked list of Prince's best songs.

It is ranked number 431 on Rolling Stone's list of The 500 Greatest Songs of All Time.

Cover versions and samples
Other performers who have recorded "Adore" include Silk, TQ, Julius Papp, and Joe Roberts.

The song "All That" on Carmen Electra's Prince-produced debut album is based on a sample from "Adore".

References

1980s ballads
Prince (musician) songs
Songs written by Prince (musician)
1987 songs
Pop ballads
Funk ballads
Contemporary R&B ballads
Soul ballads
Silk (group) songs
Song recordings produced by Prince (musician)